Kesaria Assembly constituency, sometimes spelt 'Kesariya', is an assembly constituency in Purvi Champaran district in the Indian state of Bihar.

Overview
As per orders of Delimitation of Parliamentary and Assembly constituencies Order, 2008, 15. Kesaria Assembly constituency is composed of the following: Kesaria community development block; Uttari Bariyaria, Paschhimi Madhubani, Uttari Madhubani, Dakshini Madhubani, Purbi Madhubani, Bhatwalia, Barwa, Bariyaria Tolarajpur, Uttari Bhawanipur, Dakshini Bhawanipur and Dumariya gram panchayats of Sangrampur CD Block; Dilawarpur, Rajpur, Darmaha, Raghunathpur, Medan Sirisiya and Pipra
Khem gram panchayats of Kalyanpur CD Block.

Kesaria Assembly constituency is part of 3. Purvi Champaran (Lok Sabha constituency). It was earlier part of Motihari (Lok Sabha constituency).

Members of Vidhan Sabha

Election Results

2020

2010

1977-2010
In the November 2010 state assembly elections, Sacchindra Prasad Singh of BJP won the 15 Kesaria assembly seat defeating his nearest rival Ramsharan Prasad Yadav of CPI. Contests in most years were multi cornered but only winners and runners are being mentioned.  Rajesh Kumar Raushan of RJD defeated Razia Khatoon of JD(U) in October 2005. Obaidullah of JD(U) defeated Rajesh Kumar Raushan of RJD in February 2005. Obaidullah of SAP defeated Yamuna Yadav of KSP in 2000. Yamuna Yadav of CPI defeated Kiran  Shukla of BPP in 1995 and Rai Hari Shankar Sharma of BJP in 1990. Rai Hari Shankar Sharma representing Congress defeated Yamuna Yadav of CPI in 1985. Rai Hari Shankar Sharma representing Janata Party (JP) defeated Laxman Singh of Congress in 1980. Pitambar Singh of CPI defeated Rai Hari Shankar Sharma of Janata Party in 1977.

Assembly Elections 1967
 P. Sinha (CPI) : 15,933 votes
 M. Prasad (INC) : 13544

References

External links
 

Assembly constituencies of Bihar
Politics of East Champaran district